Justin Bourne (born December 12, 1982) is an American sportswriter. A former professional ice hockey player, he has also coached professionally, most recently as an assistant coach for the Toronto Marlies of the American Hockey League.

Playing career
Bourne played collegiate hockey for the University of Alaska Anchorage before ending the 2006-07 season with the ECHL's Alaska Aces. He was signed the following year by the Utah Grizzlies, going on to score 10 goals and 10 assists in a 17-game stretch, and playing in the 2008 ECHL All-Star game.

Writing career
Bourne's writing career began after a serious jaw injury forced him into retirement. In his first year as a columnist for USA Today, his piece on stopping the use of gay slurs in sports encouraged Brendan Burke to tell his story. Alongside USA Today, his articles have been featured across brands including Greg Wyshynski's Puck Daddy, The Hockey News, Hockey Primetime, as well as various other newspapers and websites.

Bourne eventually joined The Score as a featured writer and stats analyst, as well as a senior hockey columnist for The Athletic and Sportsnet.

Coaching career
On November 25, 2015, Bourne left his position at The Score to become an assistant coach for the Toronto Marlies of the American Hockey League, working with the team's video coaching for two seasons.

Personal life
Bourne's father Bob won the Stanley Cup four times as a centre for the New York Islanders. Bourne is currently married to Brianna, daughter of former NHL all-star Clark Gillies.

Career statistics

Awards and honors

References

External links

Justin Bourne's personal blog

1982 births
Living people
American men's ice hockey forwards
Alaska Aces (ECHL) players
Alaska Anchorage Seawolves men's ice hockey players
Bridgeport Sound Tigers players
Ice hockey people from New York (state)
Idaho Steelheads (ECHL) players
People from Huntington, New York
Reading Royals players
Utah Grizzlies (ECHL) players
Vernon Vipers players
Writers from New York (state)
Sportswriters from New York (state)
Ice hockey players from New York (state)